Federal Route 57 comprising Jalan Long Yunus and Jalan Pengkalan Chepa (now Jalan Tok Guru) is a federal road in Kelantan, Malaysia. It is a main route to Sultan Ismail Petra Airport at Pengkalan Chepa.

Features
At most sections, the Federal Route 57 was built under the JKR R5 road standard, allowing maximum speed limit of up to 90 km/h.

List of junctions and towns

References

Malaysian Federal Roads